Damen is an 'L' station on the CTA's Brown Line. It is an elevated station with two side platforms, located at 4643–47 North Damen Avenue in Chicago's Ravenswood neighborhood. The adjacent stations are Western, which is located about one half mile (0.8 km) to the west, and Montrose, about one half mile (0.8 km) to the southeast. Located three blocks east is the Ravenswood Metra station on the commuter railroad's Union Pacific/North Line.

History

Damen Station opened in 1907 as part of Northwestern Elevated Railroad's Ravenswood line. The station was originally named Robey for the original name of the street on which it is located. During CTA's AB-Skip-Stop Service on the Brown Line, from 1949 to 1995, Damen was an "A" station.

Brown Line Capacity Expansion Project
The Brown Line Capacity Expansion Project aims to allow eight car trains on the Brown Line by the extension of the platforms at all stations. At the same time all Brown Line stations are being upgraded to meet ADA requirements. On November 26, 2007, Damen Station closed for twelve months to be rebuilt as part of this project. It retained many of its historic features during reconstruction, however, and reopened on December 19, 2008.

Bus and rail connections
CTA
  50 Damen 
Metra
 Ravenswood (Metra)

Notes and references

Notes

References

External links 
 
 Damen station at CTA official website
 Damen (Ravenswood Line) Station Page
 Damen Avenue entrance from Google Maps Street View

CTA Brown Line stations
Railway stations in the United States opened in 1907
1907 establishments in Illinois